The Circuit d'Alger was a cycling race held annually from 2011 to 2016 in Algeria. It was rated 2.2 event on the UCI Africa Tour.

Winners

References

Cycle races in Algeria
2011 establishments in Algeria
Recurring sporting events established in 2011
UCI Africa Tour races